Cochrane is a surname with multiple independent origins, two Scottish and one Irish. One of the Scottish names derives from a place in Scotland; the Irish surname and the other Scottish surname are both anglicisations of surnames from the Irish language and Scottish Gaelic respectively.

History
The name Cochrane originates from a habitational name derived from the "Lowlands of Cochrane", near Paisley in Renfrewshire. The derivation of the place name is uncertain. One possibility is that it is derived from the Welsh coch meaning "red"; however this theory is not supported by the early spelling of the name Coueran. 
It is also possible the name is derived from the Welsh word "cywrain", which means "skilled". Early recorded bearers of the surname are Waldeve de Coueran in 1262; William de Coughran in 1296; and Robert de Cochrane in about 1360.

In Scotland during the 18th century, the surname was used as a Lowland adaptation of the Scottish Gaelic Maceachrain.

In Ireland the surname was adopted as an Anglicisation of the surnames Ó Cogaráin and Mac Cogaráin, meaning respectively the descendant or the son of Cogarán (probably a diminutive of cogar "confidant").

Demographics

The surname is especially concentrated in England in the counties of Durham in the North of England and Kent in the south. In Scotland, Cochrane is found in high frequency in the counties of South Lanarkshire, West Lothian and in Renfrewshire. The surname is the 224th most common surname in Scotland, 957th most common in England and ranked in the top 100 surnames of a number of former British colonies. There are a number of spelling variations including Cochran, Cockren, and Coughran.

Together Scotland and England have the highest percentage of the Cochrane surname anywhere in the world. In Ireland, the surname Cochrane is especially concentrated in the northern province of Ulster where it was introduced by Protestant Scots settlers during the Plantation period of the 17th century. It was also adopted as an anglicisation by some Corcoran families.

In Northern Ireland, the surname Cochrane is concentrated in the counties of Antrim, Londonderry, Down and Tyrone. James Cochrane, an Ulsterman, was a 19th-century entrepreneur who helped the Irish whiskey Bushmills and the Old Bushmills Distillery gain worldwide popularity.

In the United States, Cochranes arrived amongst the Ulster-Scots immigrants to the British North American colonies of New Hampshire and Pennsylvania. Many Cochranes lived in Winedham New Hampshire.  They eventually moved to Boston, and now some of them live in Reston, Virginia.  Some of the earliest Cochranes in the United States came from County Antrim, Northern Ireland, in the early 18th century after obtaining a land grant from the Governor of Massachusetts. Later Cochranes would arrive from Scotland and England.

Motto

Virtute et labore, a Latin phrase meaning "by valour and exertion".

People

 Alasdair Cochrane (born 1978), British political theorist and ethicist
 Sir Alexander Inglis Cochrane, British 18th/19th century seaman
 Alexander Baillie-Cochrane, British Conservative Party (UK) politician
 Alun Cochrane, Scottish comedian
 Annalisa Cochrane (born 1996), American actress
 Archibald Cochrane, 9th Earl of Dundonald, Scottish nobleman and inventor.
 Archibald Cochrane, Rear admiral in the Royal Navy
 Sir Archibald Douglas Cochrane, Unionist-Conservative and British Governor of Burma.
 Archie Cochrane, British physician and researcher, after whom the Cochrane Collaboration is named.
 Arthur Cochrane (officer of arms) (1872–1954),officer of arms at the College of Arms in London
 Arthur Cochrane (Royal Navy officer) (1824–1905)
 Arthur Ormiston Cochrane (1879–1926), Canadian politician
 Aaron Van Schaick Cochrane (1858–1943), US Representative from New York, nephew of Isaac Whitbeck Van Schaick
 Basil Cochrane (1753-1826), Scottish civil servant, businessman and inventor
 Blake Cochrane (born 1991), Australian Paralympic swimmer
 Charles Norris Cochrane, (1889–1945), Canadian historian and philosopher
 Dennis Cochrane, Canadian politician and civil servant
 Sir Desmond Cochrane (1918–79)
 Donald Cochrane (politician) (1904–1985), Australian politician
 Donald Cochrane (economist) (1917–1983), Australian econometrician
 Donald Alexander Cochrane, Canadian composer
 Douglas Cochrane, 12th Earl of Dundonald, Scottish representative peer and a British Army general
 Edward Cochrane (18341907), Canadian politician
 Edward L. Cochrane (18921959), US Navy officer and naval architect
 Elizabeth Jane Cochrane (Nellie Bly, 18641922), American journalist, writer and inventor
 Ethel Cochrane, Canadian Progressive Conservative senator.
 Francis Cochrane, Canadian Unionist-Conservative politician.

 Gordon Cochrane (1916–1994), RNZAF pilot during WWII.
 Harry Cochrane, Scottish football player
 Henry Clay Cochrane, US Marine Corps
 Lieutenant Hugh Stewart Cochrane. 86th (Royal County Down) Regiment of Foot. 1858. Recipient of Victoria Cross after Battle of Jhansi during the Indian Mutiny.
 Ian Cochrane, British novelist
 Jack Cochrane (American football) (born 1999), American football player
 J. Harwood Cochrane, Virginia businessman and philanthropist
 John Cochrane, several people
 John Cochrane (chess player) (1798–1878), Scottish chess player
 John Cochrane (politician) (1813–1898), Congressman, Civil War Union general and New York State Attorney General, 1864–1865
 John Dundas Cochrane (1793–1825), British explorer and cousin of Admiral Thomas Cochrane, 10th Earl of Dundonald
 John H. Cochrane (1957-), Economist
 John M. Cochrane (1859–1904), justice of the North Dakota Supreme Court
 Josephine Cochrane, American inventor
 Justin Cochrane, British football player
 Kira Cochrane, British journalist
 Matthew Henry Cochrane, Canadian industrialist, livestock breeder, and politician
 Michael Cochrane, British actor
 Michael Cochrane, jazz pianist
 Mickey Cochrane, Hall of Fame baseball player
 Mike Cochrane, New Zealand hurdler
 Nathaniel Day Cochrane, British naval officer
Neil Cochrane, football player
Pauline Atherton Cochrane (born 1929), American librarian 
 Ralph Cochrane, British RAF Air Chief Marshal WW2
 Robert Cochrane, architect to the court of King James III of Scotland
 Robert Cochrane, wiccan
 Rory Cochrane, American actor
 Ryan Cochrane, American soccer player
 Ryan Cochrane, Canadian swimmer
 Terry Cochrane, Northern Irish footballer
 Terry Cochrane, Canadian football player
 Thomas Cochrane, 10th Earl of Dundonald, 19th century Royal Navy Admiral and British Whig Party politician
 Thomas Cochrane, 1st Baron Cochrane of Cults, Scottish Conservative-Unionist. British Army general.
 Thomas John Cochrane 19th century Governor of Newfoundland
 Tom Cochrane, Canadian musician
 Vincent Cochrane (1916–1987), American mycologist
 William Cochrane, Scottish MP in the British Parliament
 William Cochrane, 1st Earl of Dundonald
 William Arthur Cochrane, Canadian physician, paediatrician, academic, and medical executive
 William Cochran (physicist) Scottish physicist

Fictional Characters
 Zefram Cochrane, inventor of the warp drive in the Star Trek universe
 Col. Cochrane, character in Child's Play 3

See also
 Cochrane baronets (1903– )
 Cochran
 Corcoran

References

External links
 Official Clan Cochrane Home Page

English-language surnames
Surnames of Irish origin
Surnames of Scottish origin
Clan Cochrane
Scottish toponymic surnames